Tullogher–Rosbercon GAA is a Gaelic Athletic Association club located in Rosbercon, County Kilkenny, Ireland. The club was founded in 1888 and fields teams in both hurling and Gaelic football.

Honours
 Kilkenny Senior Club Football Championships: (8) 1930, 1931, 1934, 1936, 1937, 1941, 1944, 1962
 Kilkenny Intermediate Football Championships: (2)	1994, 2018
 Leinster Junior Club Hurling Championships: (1) 2008
 Kilkenny Junior Hurling Championship: (5) 1957, 1989, 1992, 1997, 2008
 Kilkenny Junior Football Championship: (5) 1922, 1928, 1935, 1948, 1986

Notable players
Walter Walsh

References

External links
 Tullogher–Rosbercon GAA website

Gaelic games clubs in County Kilkenny
Hurling clubs in County Kilkenny
Gaelic football clubs in County Kilkenny